New Hope is a heritage railroad station on the New Hope Railroad in New Hope, Pennsylvania, United States.

History

New Hope station was once the terminal point of the Reading Company's New Hope Branch. Regular service to this station ended September 1952.
The station became a heritage railroad station of the NHRR, which was originally known as the New Hope Branch of the Reading Company (RDG), which leased the North Pennsylvania Railroad, of which it was a part. The railroad ran as far as Hartsville Station (near Bristol Road) until March 21, 1891, when the line was extended to the long-desired terminal of New Hope, Pennsylvania.

A decade after June 1952, when Hatboro-New Hope passenger service terminated, the RDG's financial situation was precarious. Looking to rid themselves of unprofitable branch lines via abandonment, a group of train buffs and businessmen led by Philadelphia attorney Kenneth Souser — established as Steam Trains, Inc. — were seeking to operate steam trains on a for-profit basis. Steam Trains, Inc. became organized as the New Hope and Ivyland Railroad, and on June 20, 1966, the 16.7 mile line was sold for $200,000, equal to $ today.

References

External links

Former Reading Company stations
Railway stations in the United States opened in 1891
Railway stations closed in 1952
Railway stations in the United States opened in 1966
Railway stations in Bucks County, Pennsylvania